The Nilgiri day gecko (Cnemaspis nilagirica) is a species of gecko endemic to southern India. It was formerly known only from a single female specimen collected in 1885 that was misidentified as a variety of the Kandyan day gecko (C. kandiana var. tropidogaster ) by George Albert Boulenger, who used it as a syntype for his description of the variety. After a living population was not reported for over 130 years, a live male was collected in 2019, marking the first collection of a male specimen of C. nilagirica.

References

Cnemaspis
Reptiles described in 2007